Arthur's Stone, located near Kerikeri, is recognised as New Zealand's earliest monument to a Pākehā (European). It was erected in November 1840, by Reverend Richard Taylor in memory of his 10-year-old son Arthur who died at the site as a result of a fall from a horse. The stone was entered into the Heritage New Zealand
list of historic places on 14 May 2008, as a Category 1 List No:7743.

History 
The stone was erected on 9 November 1840, by Reverend Richard Taylor as a memorial to his son Arthur. Taylor wrote an account in his journal of the memorial being erected stating he had returned that same evening "having waited to see a basaltic column of 7½ feet put up on the spot where poor Arthur met his death. It was carried from the Kerikeri". The following day Taylor and a person named Steele returned to the site whitewashed the stone, cleared a circle around its base and planted it with clover.

Ten-year-old Arthur Taylor was accompanying his father Reverend Richard Taylor from Kerikeri to Waimate to meet his mother, when according to a contemporary report, the horse he was riding was startled by a touch of a switch and bolted, causing Arthur to fall from the saddle and being dragged by the stirrup resulting in his death on October 12, 1840.

References 

Monuments and memorials in New Zealand
Far North District